Signorini is an Italian surname. Notable people with the surname include:

Alfonso Signorini (born 1964), an Italian television host
Andrea Signorini (born 1990), an Italian footballer, son of Gianluca Signorini
Antonio Signorini (physicist) (1888-1963), an Italian mathematical physicist
Antonio Signorini (artist) (born 1971), Italian artist active in sculpture, painting and monumental art
Francesca Signorini (née Caccini) (1587-1641), an Italian musician
Gaetano Signorini (1806-1872), an Italian painter
Gianluca Signorini (1960-2002), an Italian footballer
Giuseppe Signorini (1857-1932), an Italian painter
Glauco Signorini (1913-1987), an Italian footballer
Renato Signorini (1902-1966), an Italian sculptor
Róbson Michael Signorini (born 1987), a Brazilian footballer
Telemaco Signorini (1835-1901), an Italian artist and member of the Macchiaioli
Veronica Signorini (born 1987), an Italian triathlete

See also
The Signorini problem, an elastostatics problem in linear elasticity

Italian-language surnames